The Asteriidae are a diverse family of Asteroidea (sea stars) in the order Forcipulatida. It is one of three families in the order Forcipulatida.

Genera

The World Register of Marine Species lists these genera within the family Asteriidae (in a field of 6 families):

 Adelasterias Verrill, 1914
 Anasterias Perrier, 1875
 Aphanasterias Fisher, 1923     
 Aphelasterias Fisher, 1923
 Asterias Linnaeus, 1758

 Astrometis Fisher, 1923 
 Astrostole Fisher, 1923
 Caimanaster A.M. Clark, 1962
 Calasterias Hayashi, 1975
 Coronaster Perrier, 1885    
 Coscinasterias Verrill, 1867
 Cryptasterias Verrill, 1914
 Diplasterias Perrier, 1891
 Distolasterias Perrier, 1896
 Evasterias Verrill, 1914 

 Icasterias Fisher, 1923
 Kenrickaster A.M. Clark, 1962
 Leptasterias Verrill, 1866
 
 Lethasterias Fisher, 1923 
 Lysasterias Fisher, 1908
  
 Marthasterias Jullien, 1878 
 Meyenaster Verrill, 1913
 Neosmilaster Fisher, 1930
 Notasterias Koehler, 1911
 Orthasterias Verrill, 1914    
 Perissasterias H.L. Clark, 1923 
 Pycnopodia Stimpson, 1862
 Pisaster Müller and Troschel, 1840 
 Plazaster Fisher, 1941
 Psalidaster Fisher, 1940
 Rathbunaster Fisher, 1906 
 Saliasterias Koehler, 1920
 Sclerasterias Perrier, 1891    
 Stephanasterias Verrill, 1871 

 Stylasterias Verrill, 1914  
 Taranuiaster McKnight, 1973
 Tarsaster Sladen, 1889 
 Tarsastrocles Fisher, 1923
 Uniophora Gray, 1840
 Urasterias Verrill, 1909

References

 
Echinoderm families
Taxa named by John Edward Gray